William E. Williams (28 March 1925 – 27 December 2007) was a Welsh rugby union, and professional rugby league footballer who played in the 1940s.

Background
Billy Williams was born in Abertillery/Cwmtillery, Wales, and he died aged 82 in Telford, Shropshire, England.

Playing career

International honours
Billy Williams represented Wales XV (RU) while at Newport RFC in the 'Victory International' non-Test match(es) between December 1945 and April 1946.

County honours
Billy Williams represented Monmouthshire County RFC (RU) against New Zealand in 1945.

Personal life
Bill Williams' marriage to Muriel (née Hiley) (birth registered February 1926 in Swansea district – died August 2004) was registered during third ¼ 1948 in Swansea District, they were married until her death in August 2004. They had one daughter Rebecca J. Williams (birth registered second ¼  in Loughborough district), and four grandchildren (Rhiannon, James, Liz and Kate). After retiring from playing rugby Bill Williams became a Mathematics and Physical education teacher, and school rugby union coach at Loughborough Grammar School from 1950 to 1962, and later in Broadstairs, Kent at St. Lawrence College, Ramsgate.

Note
The page on the walesonline.co.uk website entitled 'Welsh stars still had a rugby ball in wartime' states that Billy Williams had already changed code to rugby league at the time of the 'Victory International' matches. However, the blackandambers.co.uk website indicates that he was still a rugby union footballer for Newport RFC at the time.
Billy Williams was definitely active playing for Wales and the Victory Internationals during World War II, as well as working in the coal mines as one of the Bevin Boys.

References

External links
Search for "Williams" at rugbyleagueproject.org
Two Newport players awarded posthumous Wales caps

1925 births
2007 deaths
Bevin Boys
Footballers who switched code
Monmouthshire County RFC players
Newport RFC players
Rugby league players from Abertillery
Rugby league wingers
Rugby union players from Abertillery
Rugby union wings
Swinton Lions players
Wales international rugby union players
Welsh miners
Welsh rugby league players
Welsh rugby union players